Oleksandr Demchenko (born 13 February 1996) is a Ukrainian professional footballer who plays as a midfielder for FC Oleksandriya.

Career
Born in Vinnytsia, Demchenko is a product of the sportive schools from his native city and of the Shakhtar Donetsk academy and Lviv State School of Physical Culture.

After playing in the lower leagues teams in Ukraine and Italy, in July 2021, he signed a contract with the Ukrainian Premier League side Oleksandriya.

References

External links
 
 
 

1996 births
Living people
Footballers from Vinnytsia
Ukrainian footballers
FC Mariupol players
FC Vinnytsia players
FC Metalist 1925 Kharkiv players
Abano Calcio players
FC Nyva Vinnytsia players
FC Nyva Ternopil players
FC Kremin Kremenchuk players
FC Oleksandriya players
Ukrainian Premier League players
Ukrainian First League players
Ukrainian Second League players
Ukrainian Amateur Football Championship players
Serie D players
Promozione players
Association football midfielders
Ukrainian expatriate footballers
Expatriate footballers in Italy
Ukrainian expatriate sportspeople in Italy